Aleksander "Sandër" Prosi (6 January 1920 – 24 March 1985) was an Albanian film and theater actor and violin player. He was given the People's Artist of Albania award by the Albanian government. He is considered one of the greatest Albanian actors of all times.

Life and work
Prosi was born in Shkodër, Albania, in January 1920. His family moved to Tirana when he was 14, where he graduated at Qemal Stafa High School. Prosi's father was originally from Moscopole and was an Aromanian, which made him of Aromanian descent too.

His first role was in William Tell drama from Schiller. He went to study dentistry in Vienna, Austria, but did not finish his studies. In 1947, he participates in the competition at the National Theatre of Albania and wins. He has interpreted more than 100 roles in the theater and in movies.

He has created unforgettable characters such as Vuksani in "The second face", Horatio in Hamlet, Otello in Otello, Miller in Intrigue and Love from Schiller, Dhaskal Todri in "Letter's way", Ismail Qemali in "Second November", etc.

He was a professor in the Academy of Arts of Albania during 1962—1975.

His death in 1985 created many controversies in Albania, as it was talked as a suicide, these were just never proved gossips, and the media never reported his end of life as such. In 2010, Prosi was awarded the Honor of the Nation title by the President of the Republic of Albania.

References

Albanian male stage actors
1920 births
People from Shkodër
Albanian people of Aromanian descent
Aromanian actors
1985 deaths
Albanian male film actors
People's Artists of Albania
Qemal Stafa High School alumni
20th-century Albanian male actors
People from Tirana
1985 suicides
Suicides in Albania